Boos or BOOS may refer to:..

Places
Boos, Bavaria, in Bavaria, Germany
Boos, Bad Kreuznach, in Rhineland-Palatinate, Germany 
Boos, Mayen-Koblenz, in Rhineland-Palatinate, Germany 
Boos, Seine-Maritime, in Seine-Maritime, France
Boos, Landes, in Landes, France
Boos-Waldeck Castle, the residence for the Family Boos from 1150 to 1833

Other uses
Boos (surname)
Booing

See also
Boo (disambiguation)
Booze (disambiguation)